Ballast Point may refer to:

Places

Australia
 Ballast Point (New South Wales), a point in the suburb of Birchgrove in Sydney
 Ballast Point Park (New South Wales), a park in the suburb of Birchgrove in Sydney

United States
 Ballast Point Light, a lighthouse situated on Ballast Point, on Point Loma in San Diego Bay, California
 Ballast Point (Tampa), a neighborhood in the city of Tampa, Florida
 Ballast Point Park, a park in the neighborhood of Ballast Point in the city of Tampa, Florida

Other
Ballast Point Brewing Company, American brewery founded in San Diego, California